Envex is a company which develops financial instruments for electricity trading and emissions trading under the Clean Energy Bill 2011 and other environmental markets in Australia.

History 
The company was founded in February 2008 as a joint venture between Macquarie Group Limited and the Financial and Energy Exchange.  In July of the same year Climate Exchange PLC, owner of  the European Climate Exchange and the Chicago Climate Exchange, acquired a stake in Envex. Following the purchase of the European Climate Exchange by ICE, ICE also became the holder of Envex.

The core focus of Envex's work is to develop tradable contracts for Over-the-Counter and exchange-based trading to "enable trading in a range of environmental products" in the Australian markets. These include financial instruments related to the underlying units of the Mandatory Renewable Energy Target scheme, the Carbon Price Mechanism ( also known as the Clean Energy Bill 2011), the Queensland Gas Scheme, Victorian Energy Efficiency Target and South Australian Energy Savings Scheme.

Current Board Members 
 Brian Price, Non Executive Director
 Dimitri Burshtein, Non Executive Director
 David Peniket, Non Executive Director

See also

 Carbon Pollution Reduction Scheme
 Emissions Trading
 Mandatory renewable energy targets
 New South Wales Greenhouse Gas Abatement Scheme

External links
 Envex Official website
 Carbon Pollution Reduction Scheme website

References

Financial services companies established in 2008
Financial services companies of Australia